Jeanne de Navarre may refer to:

 Joan I of Navarre (c. 1271–1305)
 Joan II of Navarre (1312–1349) 
 Joan of Navarre, Queen of England (c. 1370–1437)
 Jeanne III of Navarre (1528–1572)